The Box is a 2009, American psychological thriller film written and directed by Richard Kelly. It is based on the 1970, short story "Button, Button" by Richard Matheson, which was previously adapted into an episode of The Twilight Zone. The film stars Cameron Diaz and James Marsden as a couple who receive a box from a mysterious man (played by Frank Langella) who offers them one million dollars if they press the button sealed within the dome on top of the box, but tells them that, once the button has been pushed, someone they do not know will die.

Plot
In December 1976, financially desperate NASA engineer Arthur Lewis and his wife Norma find a package on their doorstep, containing a wooden box with a large red button. The mysterious and disfigured Mr. Steward arrives to deliver the key to unlock the button, and tells Norma that if the button is pushed, she will receive $1 million in cash, but someone she does not know will die. He gives her $100 for allowing him to enter the house and voice his deal, and leaves.

Norma and Arthur argue over Steward's offer, complicated by the news that their son Walter's private school, where Norma teaches, will no longer provide a discount for his tuition. They open the box to discover it is 'just a bunch of wood', and Arthur chastises Norma for her fear, but no decision is made before they go to sleep.

They discuss the matter further in the morning, and after work, Arthur reveals that the hundred dollar bill is real. After further discussion, Norma impulsively pushes the button, whispering 'It's just a box'. It is revealed that someone is shot, and the gunman ran from the scene with a briefcase. Mr. Steward arrives and presents Arthur and Norma with the $1 million, assuring them that someone did indeed die as a result of their actions, and that the same offer will be presented to someone else they do not know. Arthur attempts to return the money, but Steward declines, stating that he can do nothing because "the button has been pressed".

The police treat the murder as a domestic homicide, and it is discovered that the husband of the woman who was shot is a colleague of Arthur's. NASA chief Martin Teague and Norm Cahill, Arthur's boss, discuss Cahill's missing colleague, Arlington Steward. The chief tells Cahill that Steward became "something else" after being killed by lightning, shortly after NASA received the first photograph transmitted by the Viking 1 Mars lander in July 1976.

Arthur and Norma become plagued by seemingly supernatural happenings and are visited by others who fell victim to the box, pressing the button and suffering the same fate as the Lewis family. It is revealed that Steward has been collaborating with a group of benefactors, using the box to decide whether the human race is worth preserving.

After several paranormal incursions, Steward returns to the Lewis home and informs them that Walter, earlier kidnapped by unknown assailants, is locked in the family's bathroom upstairs and has been stricken blind and deaf. Steward laments that he had hoped the family would not succumb to the temptation of the money, and delivers a final ultimatum: They may keep the money and live out their lives with their disabled son, or Arthur can kill Norma, thereby restoring Walter's sight and hearing, with the million dollars placed in a high-interest account available to him when he turns 18. Steward refuses Norma's proposal to kill herself. Arthur contemplates killing Steward, but Steward warns him he will be charged with the murder, his son's condition will remain, and the family will be left with nothing. Steward departs, and Arthur realizes the choice to push the button has placed the family in purgatory. Norma, wanting her son to live his life without disability, asks Arthur to kill her, and after a long goodbye, he reluctantly agrees but cannot bring himself to pull the trigger.

Another couple is offered the same box. They also decide to press the button; at the same time, Arthur shoots Norma while embracing her, and Walter is healed from his condition. It is implied that this mysterious offer will continue among other couples in the future.

Cast
 Cameron Diaz as Norma Lewis
 James Marsden as Arthur Lewis
 Frank Langella as Arlington Steward
 James Rebhorn as Norm Cahill
 Holmes Osborne as Dick Burns
 Sam Oz Stone as Walter Lewis
 Gillian Jacobs as Dana / Sarah Matthews
 Celia Weston as Lana Burns
 Deborah Rush as Clymene Steward
 Lisa K. Wyatt as Rhonda Martin
 Mark Cartier as Martin Teague
 Kevin Robertson as Wendell Matheson
 Michele Durrett as Rebecca Matheson
 Ian Kahn as Vick Brenner
 John Magaro as Charles 
 Ryan Woodle as Jeffrey Carnes

Production
Director Richard Kelly wrote a script based on the 1970 short story "Button, Button" by author Richard Matheson, which had previously been turned into a Twilight Zone episode of the same name. The project had a budget of over $30 million provided by Media Rights Capital. Kelly described his intent for the film, "My hope is to make a film that is incredibly suspenseful and broadly commercial, while still retaining my artistic sensibility." Actress Cameron Diaz was cast in the lead role in June 2007.

Most of the filming took place in the Boston, Massachusetts area, with scenes shot in downtown Boston, South Boston, Waltham, Ipswich, Winthrop, Milton, Medfield, Quincy, Kingston, and North Andover, as well as other localities. Some filming took place on the Milton Academy campus and at Boston Public Library. A large indoor set was built inside a former Lucent Technologies building in North Andover to recreate a NASA laboratory. The production crew also journeyed to NASA's Langley Research Center in Hampton, Virginia, to shoot a number of scenes for the film. Richard Kelly's father had worked at NASA Langley in the 1970s and 80s.

Filming also took place in Richmond, Virginia, including overhead shots of the city, including 95 South passing the train station. Many background extras were reused in different scenes, and people with period-correct 60s and 70s cars were encouraged to participate. Arlington Steward's car, in particular, is a Buick Electra, although characters in the movie refer to it as Lincoln Town Car (an entirely different car model, which was not yet in production at the time the movie is set).

Actor Frank Langella was cast in October 2007, and production began on the film the following month. Prior to production, actor James Marsden was cast a lead role opposite Diaz. Production concluded by February 2008. It was the second time Marsden and Langella worked together, the first being Superman Returns and re-teaming again in Robot & Frank.

Music
In December 2008, it was announced that Win Butler and Regine Chassagne of Canadian band Arcade Fire, and Owen Pallett provided an original score for the film. Butler, Chassagne, and Pallett helped Kelly during the editing process by advising his decisions. Butler, Chassagne, and Pallett had planned on releasing the soundtrack after Arcade Fire's third album release in August 2010, but as of 2021, the soundtrack is still unavailable.

Release
The film was first released in Australia on October 29, 2009. While it was originally scheduled to be released in the U.S. on October 30, 2009, on July 31, 2009, it was announced the release date would be delayed to November 6, 2009.

The film opened with $7,571,417 in 2,635 theaters at an average of $2,873 per theater. It ranked number 6 at the box office coming in behind the newly released Disney's A Christmas Carol, The Men Who Stare at Goats, and The Fourth Kind. The film went on to gross $15,051,977 domestically and $32,924,206 worldwide.

It was released on DVD, Blu-ray and digital download in the U.S. on February 23, 2010.

Reception
Review aggregator Rotten Tomatoes reports that 44% of 153 critics have given the film a positive review, and the average rating is 5.1 out of 10. The site's consensus is that "Imaginative but often preposterous, The Box features some thrills but largely feels too piecemeal." Metacritic, which assigns a rating out of 100 to reviews from film critics, has a score of 47 based on 24 reviews. Audiences polled by CinemaScore on opening day gave the film an F, for which CinemaScore President Ed Mintz blamed the film's ending and was quoted as saying "People really thought this was a stinker." , it is one of only 22 films to receive such a rating.

Roger Ebert of the Chicago Sun-Times gave the film three out of four stars and wrote: "This movie kept me involved and intrigued, and for that I'm grateful." Jordan Mintzer of Variety wrote: "Kelly's trademark mix of sci-fi, surrealism and suburbia occasionally entertains." Keith Uhlich of Time Out New York named The Box the ninth-best film of 2009, calling it "a defiantly personal project that solidifies writer-director Richard Kelly's talent, even as it surely pushes him further toward the filmmaking fringe."

Awards
The film was nominated at the 8th Visual Effects Society Awards in the category of Outstanding Supporting Visual Effects in a Feature Motion Picture but lost to Sherlock Holmes.

References

External links
 
 
 
 
 

2009 films
2009 science fiction films
2009 psychological thriller films
American science fiction thriller films
American psychological thriller films
Films about NASA
Films based on science fiction short stories
Films based on works by Richard Matheson
Films directed by Richard Kelly
Films produced by Dan Lin
Films set in 1976
Films set in Norfolk, Virginia
Films shot in Boston
Films shot in Quincy, Massachusetts
Films shot in Virginia
Media Rights Capital films
Warner Bros. films
2000s English-language films
2000s American films